Fiske is a hamlet in Pleasant Valley Rural Municipality No. 288, Saskatchewan, Canada. Listed as a designated place by Statistics Canada, the hamlet had a population of 65 in the Canada 2016 Census.

Demographics 

Economy 

Grain farming, ranching, and trades are the main sectors in which Fiskinites are employed. Oil and gas is another source of income that has recently opened up in the area. Fiske hosts an ice arena, community hall, and a few home businesses.

See also 

 List of communities in Saskatchewan
 Hamlets of Saskatchewan
 Designated place

References 

Pleasant Valley No. 288, Saskatchewan
Designated places in Saskatchewan
Organized hamlets in Saskatchewan
Division No. 12, Saskatchewan